Archibald Frank Engelbach (1 January 1881 – 14 December 1961) was an English badminton player. He competed in the All England Badminton Championships, winning the men's doubles title in 1920 under the alias A. Fee. He was a schools gymnastic champion before taking up badminton and became a prominent badminton judge. This resulted in him being uncapped for the England team. In 1930 he married Violet Baddeley, also a well known badminton player, daughter of Herbert Baddeley, the four-time winner of the Wimbledon doubles. He died in December 1961 at his home in London aged 80.

Medal record at the All England Badminton Championships

References

English male badminton players
1881 births
1961 deaths